La Corne-en-Vexin is a commune in the Oise department in northern France. It was established on 1 January 2019 by merger of the former communes of Énencourt-le-Sec (the seat), Boissy-le-Bois and Hardivillers-en-Vexin.

See also
 Communes of the Oise department

References

Communes of Oise
Communes nouvelles of Oise
Populated places established in 2019
2019 establishments in France